Hélio is a Portuguese given name:

 Hélio (footballer), Brazil-born Hong Kong footballer Hélio José de Souza Gonçalves (born 1986)
 Helio Alves
 Helio André
 Helio Batista (footballer, born 1973)
 Hélio Batista (footballer, born 1990), Brazilian footballer
 Hélio Bicudo
 Hélio Ferraz de Almeida Camargo (1922–2006), Brazilian zoologist and lawyer
 Hélio Castroneves (born 1975), Brazilian auto racing driver
 Hélio Cruz
 Hélio Delmiro
 Hélio Dias (born 1943), Brazilian former football goalkeeper
 Hélio Garcia
 Hélio Gomes
 Hélio Gonçalves Heleno (1935–2012), Roman Catholic bishop
 Hélio Gracie (1913–2009), a founder of Brazilian Jiu-Jitsu
 Hélio Gueiros
 Hélio José
 Hélio Justino
 Hélio Gelli Pereira (1918–1994), Brazilian-British virologist
 Hélio Marques Pereira (1925–1971), Brazilian basketball player
 Helio Melo
 Hélio José Muniz Filho
 Hélio Oiticica
 Hélio Lourenço de Oliveira (1917–1985), Brazilian physician and academic
 Helio Pereira
 Hélio Pestana
 Hélio Pinto
 Hélio Quaglia Barbosa (1941–2008), Brazilian judge
 Helio R. Camargo
 Hélio Roque
 Hélio Rubens Garcia (born 1940), Brazilian former basketball player and coach
 Hélio de Oliveira Santos (born 1950), Brazilian physician and politician
 Hélio Silva (1926–2006), Brazilian Olympic backstroke swimmer
 Hélio da Silva (1923–1987), Brazilian Olympic sprinter
 Hélio Sousa
 Hélio Vaz
 Hélio Viana
 Helio Vieira
 Hélio Waldman

See also
 Helio (disambiguation)
 Helios (disambiguation)

Portuguese masculine given names